Aaryn Elizabeth Williams (née Gries; born September 3, 1990) is an American reality television personality, YouTuber, and business owner from San Marcos, Texas. She was best known for her appearance as a contestant on the reality television show Big Brother 15, where she was called out by the host for her racist comments.

Early life
Gries was born in San Angelo, Texas, on September 3, 1990, and raised on the ranch of her father, a German Texan. Before middle school, following her parents' divorce, she moved to Castle Rock, Colorado, with her mother. There she attended Douglas County High School, graduating in 2009. She spent the summers with her father in Texas. From a young age, Gries took an interest in cheerleading, serving on an Elite Cheerleading All-Star team before high school. In high school she was a part of varsity dance and varsity cheer; from 2005 to 2007, Gries served as a coach at the Castle Rock School of Gymnastics. From June 2011 to April 2012, she served as an Ice Girl cheerleader for the Texas Stars Hockey Club.

Pageantry and modeling career
While still in high school, Gries competed for and won the title of Miss Colorado Teen International 2007. Gries has worked locally in Texas as a specialty model, doing work for Maxim in Austin, Texas and was signed by Belle Petite as a promotional model. She was also signed to Zephyr Talent. As of part Zephyr Talent, Gries has landed very few gigs in Texas, including modeling lingerie on the runway during Austin Fashion Week at La Zona Rosa Marketplace. She was dropped from Zephyr Talent after making racial slurs on Big Brother.

Big Brother 15 
Gries appeared on Big Brother 15 in 2013. While in the house, Gries quickly formed a romantic relationship with David Girton. She was also part of the "Blonde-tourage" alliance with Girton, Kaitlin Barnaby, Jeremy McGuire, Nick Uhas, GinaMarie Zimmerman, and Jessie Kowalski. After Girton was evicted, Gries won the "Big Brother BBQ" Head of Household competition in the following week with McGuire (her teammate) and ended up taking the HOH position. She chose to target Elissa Slater for eviction, blaming her for Girton's exit. However, Slater was granted that M.V.P. power for a second week in a row and was able to flip the vote against Uhas, who was later evicted that week. Gries was nominated for eviction in the third week, though her ally McGuire was ultimately evicted from the house. She was nominated for a second consecutive time the following week, but worked out a deal with Helen Kim and Slater to stay in the game. Following the eviction of her ally Barnaby, Gries won her second Head of Household competition in "Roulette Me Win", making her the first HouseGuest to hold the title twice this season. She kept her end of the bargain with Slater and Kim, allowing them to control the nominations and orchestrate the eviction of Howard Overby.

Controversy
Gries became the center of controversy after making remarks widely condemned as racist and homophobic by the show's live feed viewers as well as host Julie Chen. These comments led to  negative reactions from many fans of the show, and more than 27,000 people signed a petition asking that Gries be expelled from the house before she was evicted. She also became known by the moniker "Aaryn the Aryan" in several gossip blogs that covered the controversy.  
On the controversy, CBS stated "Big Brother is a reality show about watching a group of people who have no privacy 24/7 — and seeing every moment of their lives. At times, the HouseGuests reveal prejudices and other beliefs that we do not condone. We certainly find the statements made by several of the HouseGuests on the live Internet feed to be offensive. Any views or opinions expressed in personal commentary by a HouseGuest appearing on Big Brother, either on any live feed from the house or during the broadcast, are those of the individual(s) speaking and do not represent the views or opinions of CBS or the producers of the program." It was later speculated that the HouseGuests had been warned about these comments.

She was seen on the show's live Internet feed referring to Herren as a "queer", and also referred to Asians as "squinty eyed". She remarked that Kim, her Korean American housemate, should "go make some rice." In a notable confrontation with African American houseguest Candice Stewart, Williams flipped over Stewart's bed and aggressively mocked her with a stereotypical accent when Stewart expressed disapproval of the act and threatened to "raise hell" if it happened again. She also referred to Stewart as "Aunt Jemima".

Many of the comments were eventually aired on the show, leading to media scrutiny and even more backlash from fans. Her comments in the house led to Aaryn losing representation from her talent agency and her job as a magazine spokesmodel.

Gries's mother apologized for the offensive comments after hiring a publicist, and spoke out against the exploitation of her daughter's words for ratings in an interview given to the Los Angeles Times a few days after her eviction. She further attempted to demonstrate Gries's racial tolerance by indicating she took a young African American man to her prom as her date, claiming the man was "one of her closest friends through high school". Further, she stated "Aaryn's first true love was Cuban American, and she has cousins of Japanese descent who she truly loves; she has never discriminated against anyone for their sexual orientation whether within our family or not. Aaryn truly loves all people equally." Gries's African-American prom date identified himself to TMZ as Mike Miller, sharing prom pictures with the online publication. Miller claimed Gries was not "prejudiced or hateful."  He also said Gries's sense of humor was that of a "smart-ass." Gries later apologized for such comments.

Personal life
Gries attended Texas State University, with a major in psychology. Gries has worked locally in Texas as a specialty model, doing work for Maxim in Austin, Texas, and was signed by Belle Petite as a promotional model.

References

External links
 

1990 births
Living people
American people of German descent
American television actresses
Big Brother (American TV series) contestants
People from Castle Rock, Colorado
People from San Angelo, Texas
People from San Marcos, Texas
YouTubers from Texas
21st-century American women